Marengo was a  74-gun ship of the line of the French Navy.

In November 1814, under René Lemarant de Kerdaniel, she took part in the French repossession of Guadeloupe and Martinique.

She took part in the Invasion of Algiers in 1830, and in the Battle of the Tagus under Captain Maillard Liscourt the next year.

In 1854, she took part in the Crimean War. 

She was struck on 21 July 1858 and was used as a prison hulk from 1860 to 1865. In 1866, she was renamed Pluton.

See also
 List of ships of the line of France

References

 Jean-Michel Roche, Dictionnaire des Bâtiments de la flotte de guerre française de Colbert à nos jours, tome I

Ships of the line of the French Navy
Téméraire-class ships of the line
Prison ships
Ships built in France
1810 ships
Crimean War naval ships of France